George Oldroyd (1 December 1886, Healey, West Riding of Yorkshire, England26 February 1951, London, England) was an English organist, composer and teacher of Anglican church music. He studied with the organist and composer Arthur Eaglefield Hull and took violin lessons from Johann Rasch and Frank Arnold. He graduated with a B.Mus (1912) and D.Mus (1917) at the University of London.

He was organist of St. Alban's Church, Holborn from 1919 to 1920, and then of St Michael's Church, Croydon from 1920 until his death in 1951. Both are churches firmly rooted within the Anglo-Catholic tradition in the Church of England. In the 1920s he taught at Trinity College, London, and from 1933-1948 was Director of Music at Whitgift School. From 1944 he was Dean of the Faculty of Music at London University, becoming King Edward Professor of Music from 1951.

He composed numerous settings of the mass, but is best remembered for his Mass of the Quiet Hour composed in 1928, whose swooping melodies and lush harmonies recall the "Palm Court" style of that era. It was dedicated to the Archbishop of Canterbury, Cosmo Gordon Lang, in whose diocese St. Michael's at that time lay, and is still part of the repertoire of many English cathedrals and parish churches. There is also a large scale Stabat Mater (1922), and A Spiritual Rhapsody (1931) for voices and orchestra.

Other works include the part song, 'Lute book lullaby', organ works including a Liturgical Prelude and pieces for piano and for violin. Oldroyd was an authority on counterpoint, and published The Technique And Spirit Of Fugue: An Historical Study in 1948.

Bibliography
 Henderson, John. A Directory of Composers for Organ, Third Revised and Enlarged Edition. John Henderson (Publishing) Ltd., 2005, p. 545, (Oldroyd entry) b. 12-01-1886 Healey, Yorkshire, England; d. 2-26-1951 London, England

References

External links
 

1886 births
People from Kirklees (district)
1951 deaths
English classical organists
British male organists
English composers
English Anglo-Catholics
20th-century organists
20th-century British male musicians
Male classical organists